HD 76700 b is an exoplanet orbiting the G-type main sequence star HD 76700 approximately 198 light years away in the southern constellation Volans. The planet was discovered in 2002, and was announced in 2003.

Discovery 
In 2002, a group of scientists detected planets around multiple stars, along with HD 76700. Unlike the other planets, HD 76700 b has a short and circular orbit. However, according to the newest data, the planet's orbit may be slightly eccentric.

Properties 
Due to the planet's high mass, it's a gas giant similar to Saturn. HD 76700 b was detected indirectly, so properties such as its radius, inclination, and temperature is unknown. HD 76700 b has a short 4 day orbit around its host due to it being 8 times closer than Mercury is to the Sun.

References

External links
 

Hot Jupiters
Exoplanets discovered in 2002
Giant planets
Volans (constellation)
Exoplanets detected by radial velocity